The Marala–Ravi Link Canal (MRL canal) is a canal in Pakistani Punjab that flows from the Marala Headworks on the Chenab River near Sialkot to the Ravi river. It was constructed in 1956 to transfer water from Chenab to Ravi as well as to irrigate about 60,000 hectares of land in the Sialkot and Gurjanwala districts.

The banks of the canal have no fencing and are in dilapidated condition as they have not been repaired since its construction in 1954. The banks were breached in 2014 floods.

During the Indo-Pakistani War of 1965, the Indian forces strategised to reach up to the MRL canal, driving a wedge between Sialkot and Lahore. But, the Pakistani forces fought them off, resulting in a stalemate.

During initial filling of Baglihar Dam in 2008, the canal was closed allegedly due to the non-availability of water in Chenab. Indian commentators dispute the claim.

References

External links
 Marala–Ravi link canal marked on OpenStreetMap: 1, 2

Punjab